Elvira Devinamira Wirayanti (born June 28, 1993 in Surabaya, East Java) is an Indonesian actress, Model, Beauty Pageant titleholder who was crowned Puteri Indonesia 2014, and represented her country at the Miss Universe 2014 pageant held at the FIU Arena at the Florida, United States, where she placed in the "Top 15" and won "Best National Costume" award for the second time for Indonesia, after Agni Pratistha in 2007. She is the third Indonesian and the first Javanese to be called as Miss Universe Finalists.

Early life and education
Elvira was born and raised in Surabaya, East Java - Indonesia to a Javanese parents, She is the oldest child of two siblings. Elvira works as a model since she was 16, She graduated with a law degree from Airlangga University, Surabaya – East Java with Cum Laude honour. She has reached number of achievements and has been part of the Indonesian delegation on an exchange Model United Nations-trip program to Seoul, South Korea, 24th Harvard Model United Nations Conference in 2011, and moreover was part of Indonesian delegation at Harvard National Model United Nations Conference 2012 in Boston, United States.

Pageantry

Cak Ning Surabaya
Before stepping into the field of pageantry, Elvira took part in Local Tourism Beauty Pageant of her hometown Surabaya, called "Cak Ning Surabaya", where she ended up chosen as the 1st Runner-up at Cak Ning Surabaya.

Puteri Indonesia East Java 2014 
Elvira joined the contest at the provincial level of the Puteri Indonesia East Java 2014, and ended chosen as the winner of Puteri Indonesia East Java 2014.

Puteri Indonesia 2014 
After qualifying the provincial title of Puteri Indonesia East Java 2014, Elvira represented the province of East Java in the national beauty contest, Puteri Indonesia 2014, which was held in Jakarta Convention Center, Jakarta, Indonesia on January 29, 2014. At the end of the competition, Elvira was successfully selected as the winner of Puteri Indonesia 2014 (Miss Universe Indonesia 2014),

Elvira was crowned by her successor Puteri Indonesia 2013 and Top 16 Miss Universe 2013, Whulandary Herman of West Sumatra. Elvira was crowned together with Elfin Pertiwi Rappa as Puteri Indonesia Lingkungan 2014 (Miss International Indonesia 2014) and Lily Estelita Liana as Puteri Indonesia Pariwisata 2014 (Miss Supranational Indonesia 2014). The final coronation night was graced by the reigning Miss Universe 2013, Gabriela Isler of Venezuela as the selection committee.

Miss Universe 2014
As the winner of Puteri Indonesia 2014, Elvira represented Indonesia at the 63rd edition of Miss Universe 2014 in Doral, Miami, Florida - United States, where she continued Indonesia's stake in the Miss Universe pageant by placing in the semifinals for a consecutive second time finishing as a "Top 15 semifinalist" and won "Best National Costume".

Elvira brought a national costume with the Borobudur Temple-inspired ensemble, the world largest Buddhist temple, in Magelang, Indonesia. The costume named "The Chronicle of Borobudur" designed by Jember Fashion Carnival. This is the second time for Indonesia to won "Best National Costume" award after Agni Pratistha in Miss Universe 2007. She is also wearing evening gown named "Mystical Silent Maja" inspired by X-Men character, the gown designed by anaz khairunnas. Nicknamed a gown after an "X-Men" character because of the scalelike sequins that change color from silver to pink when she moves her hand up or down the dress, In the comics, Mystique's superpower is mimicking the voice and appearance of any person.

Filmography

After returning to Indonesia, a year later Elvira received an offer to play in a film directed by Ram Soraya and John de Rantau entitled "Single"  and "Dilarang Menyanyi di Kamar Mandi". Elvira is quite proud of herself because at a very young age, Elvira has the opportunity to acting with a number of famous actors and actresses such as Raditya Dika, Rina Hasyim, Pandji Pragiwaksono, Surya Saputra and Seno Gumira Ajidarma. Since then, Elvira has appeared in several film and television films in Indonesia.

Movies

TV Films

See also

 Puteri Indonesia 2014
 Miss Universe 2014
 Elfin Pertiwi Rappa
 Lily Estelita Liana

References

External links
 
 Official Puteri Indonesia Official Website
 Official Miss Universe Official Website
 Elvira Devinamira Official Instagram

Living people
1993 births
Javanese people
Puteri Indonesia winners
Airlangga University alumni
Miss Universe 2014 contestants
Actresses from Jakarta
Indonesian beauty pageant winners
Indonesian human rights activists
Indonesian female models
Indonesian film actresses
Indonesian activists
Indonesian Muslims
Child activists
Open access activists
Education activists
People from Surabaya